Corny-sur-Moselle (literally Corny on Moselle; , (1940-1944) Korningen) is a commune in the Moselle department in Grand Est in north-eastern France.

See also
 Communes of the Moselle department

References

External links
 

Cornysurmoselle